Urmas Nigul (born 14 January 1965) is an Estonian military colonel.

From 2010 to 2012 he was the commander of 1st Infantry Brigade. Since 2015 he is the commander of NATO Force Integration Unit (NFIU) in Estonia.

References

Living people
1965 births
Estonian military personnel
Place of birth missing (living people)
21st-century Estonian people